Streptomyces ardus is a bacterium species from the genus Streptomyces which has been isolated from soil. Streptomyces ardus produces porfiromycin.

See also 
 List of Streptomyces species

References

Further reading

External links
Type strain of Streptomyces ardus at BacDive -  the Bacterial Diversity Metadatabase

ardus
Bacteria described in 1991